The Mendelssohn Scholarship, awarded by the Prussian State from 1879 to 1936, was revived in 1963 by the Prussian Cultural Heritage Foundation. The Foundation awards the Felix Mendelssohn-Bartholdy Prize once a year per competition opened to particularly talented students at one of the 23 recognised music academies in Germany.

The award is decided in a competition with two annually changing competition subjects, in which each university may nominate only one candidate or ensemble for each subject. Ensembles consisting of students from different universities may also be nominated (the universities participating in the mixed ensembles agree on which university will nominate this ensemble).

The  appoints the members of the juries. For each competition subject, they are composed of a rector as chairman, four specialist jurors and two jurors from other disciplines.

State of Prussia 
 1893: Carl Thiel
 1901: Alfred Wittenberg

Prussian Cultural Heritage Foundation 
 1963: Klaviertrio (Cologne): Bernhard Kontarsky, Jörg-Wolfgang Jahn, Thomas Bless
 1965: Yuuko Shiokawa
 1966: Walter Steffens
 1970: Raymund Havenith
 1974: Georg Faust
 1977: Marioara Trifan
 1978: Harald Feller
 1988: Herbert Fandel
 1997: Luiza Borac and Kersten McCall
 1998: Erika Geldsetzer, Marion Reinhard and Toomas Vana
 1999: Markus Schön and Anke Vondung
 2000: Franz Kaern and Birgit Kölbl
 2001: esBRASSo-Quintett and Johannes Moser
 2002: Cambini-Quintett and Julia Mai
 2003: Andrew Dewar and the Korea String Trio
 2004: Jan Skryhan and Konstantin Wolff
 2005: Kim Trio and Guilhaume Santana
 2006: Julian Arp, Frederic Belli and Caspar Frantz
 2007: Emilio Peroni, Pauline Reguig and Li-Chun Su
 2008: Orion Quartet and Wen Xiao Zheng
 2009:
 2010: Duo Parthenon aus Christine Rauh (cello) and Johannes Nies (piano) from the Hochschule für Musik, Theater und Medien Hannover
 2012: Sarah Christian and Sebastian Küchler-Blessing
 2013: Konstanze von Gutzeit
 2014: Dennis Sörös
 2015: Sara Kim 
 2016: Wataru Hisasue

Other prize winners (Scholarship of the Federal President) 
 2003: Mareile Krumbholz and Matthias Voget
 2004: Falko Hönisch, Nicolas Kyriakou and Christian Peix
 2005: Manfred Baumgärtner, Alpézso Trio and Julius Stern Trio
 2006: Tobias Bloos, Maria Daroch, Tomasz Daroch, Nicolas Naudot and Li-Chun Su
 2007: Jovana Nikolic, Marie-Claudine Papadopoulos and Alexander Schimpf
 2008: Eos Klavierquartet, Barbara Buntrock and Julia Neher
 Wettbewerb 2009:
 Klavierduo von der Hochschule für Musik und Theater München: Richard Humburger, Valentin Humburger
 Quartett von der Universität der Künste Berlin: Armida-Quartett (Martin Funda, Johanna Eschenburg, Teresa Schwamm, Peter-Philipp Staemmler)
 2010: Duo Roudi Li (cello) and Vasyl Kotys (piano), Hochschule für Musik und Theater Rostock
 2012: Iva Miletic and Nathan Laube
 2014: Sumi Hwang (singer), University of Music and Performing Arts Munich
 2015: Adrien La Marca, Hochschule für Musik "Hanns Eisler"
 2016: So Hyang In, University of Music and Performing Arts Munich

See also 
 , former Leipziger Mendelssohn-Preis, der Mendelssohn Foundation, aktuelle Auszeichnung für Persönlichkeiten, die sich um das Werk und den Geist Mendelssohn Bartholdys verdient gemacht haben.

References

External links 
 Felix-Mendelssohn-Bartholdy-Preis

German music awards
Awards established in 1963